Sevtopolis Peak is an ice-covered peak of elevation 300 m in Dryanovo Heights, Greenwich Island in the South Shetland Islands, Antarctica.  Surmounting Teteven Glacier to the west, north and east.

The peak is named after the ancient Thracian capital city of Sevtopolis near the present day Bulgarian city of Kazanlak.

Location

Maps
 L.L. Ivanov et al. Antarctica: Livingston Island and Greenwich Island, South Shetland Islands. Scale 1:100000 topographic map. Sofia: Antarctic Place-names Commission of Bulgaria, 2005.
 L.L. Ivanov. Antarctica: Livingston Island and Greenwich, Robert, Snow and Smith Islands. Scale 1:120000 topographic map.  Troyan: Manfred Wörner Foundation, 2009.

References
 Sevtopolis Peak. SCAR Composite Antarctic Gazetteer
 Bulgarian Antarctic Gazetteer. Antarctic Place-names Commission. (details in Bulgarian, basic data in English)

External links
 Sevtopolis Peak. Copernix satellite image

Mountains of Greenwich Island